was a Japanese Buddhist temple located on the border of what is now the cities of Maebashi and Takasaki Gunma Prefecture, Japan. It was one of the provincial temples established by Emperor Shōmu during the Nara period (710 – 794) for the purpose of promoting Buddhism as the national religion of Japan and standardising control of the Yamato rule to the provinces. The temple no longer exists, but the temple grounds were designated as a National Historic Site by the Japanese government in 1926.

Overview
Located in the central part of Gunma Prefecture, the temple site is on a plateau between the Someya River and the Ushiike River at the southeastern foot of Mount Haruna, on the south side of the Kan'etsu Expressway. The area contains a number of ancient ruins, including the Sannō temple ruins, which predates the kokubunji system, and what is believed to be the site of the Kōzuke provincial capital to the east. From 1980 to 1988, excavation and historic site maintenance was carried by the Gunma Prefectural Board of Education, with a second phase taking place from 2012 to 2014. In addition, excavation surveys have been conducted at the site of the Kōzuke Kokubun-niji since 1969, with an excavation survey conducted by the Takasaki City Board of Education in 2016.

History
The exact foundation date of the temple is unknown, but is believed to have been around 741 AD. Per the Shoku Nihongi, Emperor Shōmu made an offering to the temple in 749 AD, so it mush have been at least partially completed by that time. According to the Heian period Engishiki records dated 927 AD, the temple was accorded 50,000 bundles of rice for its upkeep. It is uncertain when the temple was destroyed. The rebellion of Taira no Masakado (Tengyō no Ran) in 939 AB may have been a contributing factor, as local records indicate that the temple was extensively damaged by 1030 AD. By the 14th century, the site of the Lecture Hall had become a graveyard, indicating that the temple was much smaller in scale.

Layout
The area of the temple site is estimated to be 220 meters east–west and 235 meters north–south. It followed the standardized "kokubunji layout", with a  South Gate, Middle Gate, Kondō, and Lecture Hall all arranged on the north–south main axis in a straight line, with a pagoda (estimated to be a seven-storied pagoda) on the west side of Kondō. From the left and right of the Kondō was a cloister that connected to the sites of the middle gate.

Gallery

See also
List of Historic Sites of Japan (Gunma)
provincial temple

References

External links

Gunma Prefecture official site 
Takasaki City official site  
Maebashi City official guide 

Historic Sites of Japan
Maebashi
Takasaki, Gunma
8th-century establishments in Japan
Kōzuke Province
Buddhist archaeological sites in Japan